State Highway 57 (Andhra Pradesh) is a state highway in the Indian state of Andhra Pradesh. It starts at Nellore and ends at Mypadu. The route from Badvel to Nellore was upgraded to NH 67.

See also 
 List of State Highways in Andhra Pradesh

References 

State Highways in Andhra Pradesh
Roads in Nellore district